Chondros is a village and a community in the Heraklion regional unit of the island of Crete, Greece. It is part of the municipality Viannos. The community consists of the villages Chondros, Agios Ioannis, Dermatos, Kastri and Pervola.

Notes

Populated places in Heraklion (regional unit)